CJF Fleury Loiret Handball is a women's handball club based in Fleury-les-Aubrais, Loiret, France. The professionnal team is dissolved in November 2022.

Honours 
Division 1 Féminine: 
Gold: 2015
Silver: 2016
Bronze: 2013 
Coupe de France:
Winner: 2014
Coupe de la Ligue:
Winner: 2015
Finalists: 2008
EHF Cup Winners' Cup:
Finalists: 2015
EHF Challenge Cup:
Semifinalists: 2012

European record

Current squad
Squad for the 2022-23 season

Goalkeepers 
 3  Mélodie Rapsode
 16  Justicia Toublissa Elbeco	
Wingers
RW
 21  Mélina Peillon
 76  Lisa Le Merrer
LW
 14  Suzanne Wajoka
 23  Eyatne Rizo 
Line players 
 77  Emmanuelle Thobor
   Yasmine Massa

Back players  
LB
 8  Mélissa Agathe
CB
 5  Amina Sankharé
 10  Diankenba Nianh
RB
 7  Doungou Camara
   Fanta Keita

Transfers
Transfers for the 2022-23 season.

 Joining
  Fanta Keita (RB) (from  TSV Bayer 04 Leverkusen)
  Yasmine Massa (LP) (from  Saint-Amand Handball)

Leaving
  Paulina Uścinowicz (LB) (with immediate effect to  Borussia Dortmund Handball)
  Charité Mumbongo (LB) (to  Viborg HK)
  Julie Le Blevec (RW) (to  Metz Handball)
  Kaba Gassama (LP) (to  SG BBM Bietigheim)
  Ditte Vind (GK)  (to  Bourg-de-Péage Drôme Handball)
  Elisa Técher (LB) (to  Brest Bretagne Handball)
  Laura Kamdop (LP)

References

External links 
 

French handball clubs
Sport in Loiret
Handball clubs established in 1974
Sports clubs disestablished in 2022
1974 establishments in France
2022 disestablishments in France